George Heber Connell (1836 – February 15, 1881) was a merchant and political figure in New Brunswick, Canada. He represented Carleton in the House of Commons of Canada from 1878 to 1881 as an Independent member.

He was born in Woodstock, New Brunswick, the son of Charles Connell and Ann Fisher, and was educated at Saint John. In 1837, he married Isabel Barnaby. Connell died in office in Ottawa at the age of 45.

References 
 
The Canadian parliamentary companion and annual register, 1880, CH Mackintosh

1836 births
1881 deaths
Members of the House of Commons of Canada from New Brunswick
People from Woodstock, New Brunswick